Wallis Bird (born 29 January 1982) is an Irish musician, living in Berlin since 2012. As of February 2023, she has released six studio albums, including Architect in 2014 and Home in 2016.

Career
Bird performed at the Eurosonic Festival in 2012 when Ireland was the Spotlight Country.

Bird released her third studio album in March 2012 in Ireland, Germany, Austria and Switzerland. The album was recorded in Berlin, Germany. The first single, "Encore", was released on 2 March. The music video debuted on 1 February, and had been shot in Berlin.

A live album featuring recordings from her European tours from her debut album to her 2014 release Architect, Yeah! was released in 2015.

Home is her fifth studio album, released worldwide in September 2016.

Discography

Studio albums

Live albums
 Yeah! (2015)

EPs
 Branches Untangle (six-track EP, Bird Records, 2006)
 Moodsets EP (2006)

Singles

 "Blossoms in the Street", 15 October 2007
 "Counting to Sleep", 10 March 2008 (Irish language version: "Comhaireamh chun Codladh")
 Just Can't Get Enough, 22 October 2008
 "To My Bones", 2009

Download-only releases
 The Circle EP (Germany only)

Awards
 Meteor Music Award (Category: "Hope for 2009"), 2009
 Meteor Music Award (Category: "Best Irish Female"), 2010

In popular culture
In March 2010, Bird appeared on GOTV to present her favorite music videos and musical influences.

References

Living people
1982 births
Irish folk singers
Island Records artists
Lesbian musicians
Irish LGBT singers
Musicians with disabilities
Musicians from County Wexford
21st-century Irish singers
21st-century Irish women singers
21st-century guitarists
21st-century women guitarists